The White scapular may refer to:
Scapular of the Most Blessed Trinity
Scapular of the Sacred Hearts of Jesus and Mary
Scapular of Our Lady of Good Counsel